= Big Train, Inc. =

American company

Big Train, Inc. is a privately traded company involved in the development, blending, manufacturing, and packaging of powdered drink bases for the coffeehouse and foodservice industries. The products include blended ice coffees, protein drinks, smoothies, frappes, iced teas and lemonade. Established in 1991, their corporate headquarters is located in Lake Forest, CA and the distribution center is in Santa Margarita, CA. The company was incorporated on April 5, 2006.
